Xenocrates is a Chalcedon (4th century BC) philosopher.

Xenocrates or Xenokrates is also the name of:

Xenokrates of Sicyon (3rd century BC), writer and sculptor
Xenocrates of Aphrodisias (1st century AD), physician